Tuta is a town and municipality in the Colombian Department of Boyacá, part of the subregion of the Central Boyacá Province. It borders Paipa, Pesca and Firavitoba in the east, Cómbita in the west, Sotaquirá and Paipa in the north and Chivatá, Toca and Oicatá in the south.

History 
The area of Tuta before the Spanish conquest was inhabited by the Tuta tribe who belonged to the Muisca who were organized in their loose Muisca Confederation. Ruler of the northern territories was the zaque of Hunza, modern day Tunja, who also reigned over Tuta. The Muisca spoke Chibcha and in that now extinct language Tuta means "Borrowed farmlands" or "Property of the Sun".

Modern Tuta was properly founded on June 4, 1776, by Miguel Sánchez and Juan Rodríguez Parra.

Economy 
The economy of Tuta is centered on agriculture, livestock farming and mining. Agricultural products are potatoes, barley, beans, maize, peas, onions and fruits. Mining consists of gypsum, coal, oil, kaolin, iron ore and sulphur. On the Alto de Ginua hill emeralds were discovered.

Born in Tuta 
 Miguel Samacá, former professional cyclist
 Miguel Ángel Sanabria, former professional cyclist
 Raúl Sánchez Niño, artist and folkloric music author.

Gallery

References 

Municipalities of Boyacá Department
Populated places established in 1776
1776 establishments in the Spanish Empire
Muisca Confederation
Muysccubun